Oike Street (御池通 おいけどおり Oike Dōri) is a mayor street that crosses the center of the city of Kyoto from east to west, running approximately 4.9 km from Kawabata Street (east) to Tenjingawa Street (west).

History 
During the period of the Heian-kyō, it was a narrow street known as Sanjō Bonmon Koji (三条坊門小路). From the mid Edo period the street began to be known as Oike, due to the fact that in the past it passed by a large pond (池 ike) contained inside the then larger Shinsenen. In 1945 during WW2, in the section between the west side of the Kamo River and Horikawa Street, houses and buildings were removed to create a firewall, making the street considerably wider. After 1947, due to the urban planning policy of the city, it was decided to maintain a width of 50 meters for this section.

Present Day 

Nowadays the section between Kawabata Street and Horikawa Street is the widest street in the city of Kyoto. This section is on the route of the Yamaboko Junkō parade of the Gion Matsuri and on the route of the parade of the Jidai Matsuri. Several subway stations of the Tōzai Line are located along this segment, as well as several relevant public facilities such as the Kyoto City Hall and Zest Oike, making it an important public space. For this reason, in the year 2003 after an extensive infrastructure improvement project, this section was designated as "Symbol Road" by the city of Kyoto.

Relevant landmarks along the Street 

 Kamo River
 Kyoto Hotel Okura
 Kyoto City Hall.
 Zest Oike
 Honnō-ji temple
 Hello Work Karasuma Oike Plaza
 Nichicon Corporation
 Nijō Castle
 Shinsenen Garden
Shimadzu Corporation Sanjō Factory

Train Stations

Subway 

 Kyoto Shiyakusho-mae Station
 Karasuma Oike Station
 Nijōjō-mae Station
 Nishiōji Oike Station
 Uzumasa Tenjingawa Station

JR San'in Main Line 

 Nijō Station

Links 

 Kyoto Hotel Okura
 Zest Oike
 Nichicon Corporation
Shimadzu Corporation

References 

Streets in Kyoto